Patrick or Pat Downey may refer to:

 Pat Downey (barrister) (1927–2017), New Zealand lawyer
 Pat Downey (American football) (born 1974), American football center
 Pat Downey (wrestler) (born 1992), American freestyle wrestler